Johnny Flynton  is a 2002 American short film directed and co-written by Lexi Alexander. It was nominated for Best Live Action Short Film at the 75th Academy Awards.

Plot 
Based on a true story and starring Dash Mihok in the title role, the film follows an undefeated boxer, Johnny Flynton, in a small Alabama town on the day of a local exhibition fight that sparks a series of tragic events.

Cast 
 Dash Mihok as Johnny Flynton
 Michele Matheson as Samantha Flynton
 Robert W. Hill as Sheriff Mayer
 Austin Crim as Teddy
 Georgine Gainey as Mrs. Derouville
 Raymond Thorne as Coach Tagwood
 Jim Lampley as himself
 Pat E. Johnson as Referee (as Pat Johnson)

Background 
Johnny Flynton was the first film Alexander directed. She said that the film, about a boxer from Alabama who is charged with murder, is a fictional story that was inspired by meeting a boxer in Germany when she was 9 years old, an interaction that she remembered and was the basis of the idea for the film.

Production 
The film, which Alexander entirely financed with a year's income from coaching martial arts, had a budget of $35,000.

Reception
A Film Threat review says, "Fuck 'Rocky,' this is the best film about a boxer that I've ever seen."

References

External links 
 Johnny Flynton on Vimeo
 
 Johnny Flynton on MUBI

American boxing films
2002 films
2002 short films
American short films
Films set in Alabama
Films shot in Alabama
Films directed by Lexi Alexander
Films scored by Christopher Franke
2000s English-language films
2000s American films